Paul William Oglesby (January 9, 1939 – September 25, 1994) was an American football tackle who played one season with the Oakland Raiders of the American Football League. He was drafted by the St. Louis Cardinals in the tenth round of the 1960 NFL Draft. He was also drafted by the Houston Oilers in the 1960 AFL Draft. Oglesby first enrolled at Riverside Junior College before transferring to the University of California, Los Angeles. He  attended Riverside Polytechnic High School in Riverside, California.

References

External links
Just Sports Stats

1939 births
1994 deaths
Players of American football from San Francisco
American football tackles
Riverside City Tigers football players
UCLA Bruins football players
Oakland Raiders players
American Football League players